Novik (also Romanized as Novīk, Nauwik, Nivik, and Nowvīk; also known as Nīk) is a village in Shakhenat Rural District, in the Central District of Birjand County, South Khorasan Province, Iran. At the 2006 census, its population was 76, in 27 families.

References 

Populated places in Birjand County